Hampden Stanley Bray Love (10 August 1895 – 22 July 1969) was an Australian cricketer who played in one Test match for the Australia national cricket team in 1933.  He replaced Bert Oldfield as wicket-keeper for the Ashes match played at Brisbane after Oldfield retired hurt in the Adelaide test of the Bodyline series. Love made his debut for New South Wales in the 1920–21 season but later switched to Victoria in order to gain more opportunities. He was Australia's second choice keeper for the first half of the 1930s but was unable to get a game due to Bert Oldfield's keeping ability. He also was a more than useful batsman, hitting seven hundreds in 54 games with a top score of 192.

References

1895 births
1969 deaths
Australia Test cricketers
Victoria cricketers
New South Wales cricketers
Australian cricketers
Cricketers from Sydney
Australian Imperial Force Touring XI cricketers
Wicket-keepers